Abdul Rahim Malhas (28 June 1937 – 29 September 2012) was a Jordanian politician who served as Health Minister in the government of Abdelsalam al-Majali between 1993 and 1994. He was member of the 14th House of Representatives between 2003 and 2007.

Malhas graduated with a BSc in 1959 and an MD from the American University of Beirut in 1963. He later worked in Jordanian army hospitals.

In 1994 he revealed corruption and embezzlement in health and food sectors by a publication in the newspaper Shihan.

References

1937 births
2012 deaths
American University of Beirut alumni
Health ministers of Jordan
Members of the House of Representatives (Jordan)